Engelhartszell an der Donau (Central Bavarian: Engöhoartszö) is a municipality in the district of Schärding in the Austrian state of Upper Austria.

Geography
Engelhartszell lies in the upper Danube valley in the Innviertel. About 57 percent of the municipality is forest, and 28 percent is farmland.

Notable people
 Ingrid Nargang (1929–2019), lawyer and contemporary historian

References

Sauwald
Cities and towns in Schärding District